Northern Ireland competed at the 2011 Commonwealth Youth Games in Isle of Man from 7 to 13 September 2011.The Commonwealth Games Council for Northern Ireland selected 4 competitors. Northern Ireland won three gold, two silver and three bronze medals and finished tenth overall.

References

Nations at the 2011 Commonwealth Youth Games
2011 in Northern Ireland sport